is a Japanese manga artist.

Works

External links
 Mizuho Aimoto's Japanese Homepage

Manga artists
Living people
Year of birth missing (living people)